George Papashvily (August 23, 1898 – March 29, 1978) was a Georgian-American writer and sculptor. He was one of the most famous Georgian (emigrants) artists of the 20th century.

Life
George Papashvily and his younger brother David were the two sons of Vanno and Iamze Papashvily, who were farmers in the village of Kobiaantkari, Dusheti District, Mtskheta-Mtianeti region of the modern Republic of Georgia, which was then under the rule of the House of Romanov. According to his autobiographical first book, Papashvily apprenticed as a swordmaker and ornamental leatherworker. After serving as a sniper with the Imperial Russian Army during World War I, he returned to the newly independent Democratic Republic of Georgia. Papashviliy fought in the Georgian Army under the command of General Giorgi Kvinitadze against the 1921 Red Army invasion and, after defeat on the battlefield and the Soviet annexation of his country, he fled to Istanbul, Turkey, where he lived for two years. Papashvily immigrated to the United States circa 1923-1924, and lived and worked there for the rest of his life. Papashvily succeeded both as a sculptor and as an author; he was also a gifted engineer and inventor.

Papashvily met Helen Waite in 1930, while she was managing a bookstore in Berkeley, California. They married in 1933. After a brief stint in New York City, George and Helen bought a farm and settled in Quakertown, Pennsylvania. Together, the Papashvilys wrote several books, often based on his life experiences. Their first book was Anything Can Happen, which humorously recounted Papashvily's experiences as a penniless immigrant. Originally published in a serialized format in Common Ground and Direction magazines, this book was co-selected for the Book of the Month Club and was a best-seller, selling more than 600,000 copies in the U.S. and 1.5 million worldwide. It was translated into 15 foreign languages, including Georgian (in 1966). Papashvily died in 1978 in Cambria, California.

Books by George and Helen Papashvily
 Anything Can Happen (1945)
 Yes and No Stories - A Book of Georgian Folk Tales (1946)
 Dogs and People (1954)
 Thanks to Noah (1956, in Georgian: 1971)
 Home and Home Again (1973, recounting a trip they made in the 1960s back his village of birth)
 Russian Cooking (1969)

Film adaptation
Anything Can Happen was adapted into a 1952 film of the same name, starring Jose Ferrer as George and Kim Hunter as Helen. The film won a Golden Globe for Promoting International Understanding.

Art
With no formal training, Papashvily began carving in 1940. He soon developed a signature style that was a combination of naive and modern. He carved directly in wood and stone, sculpting free-standing figures and bas relief. His favorite subjects came from nature: animals, flowers, and an occasional human figure. Among his most famous works are:

 War's End (1946)
 Pigeons (1948, Hazleton Art League)
 Ram (1951)
 Butterfly (1952, Woodmere Art Gallery)
 Horse (1955, National Art Gallery of the Republic of Georgia)
 Animal (1957, Reading Public Museum and Art Gallery)
 Apple (1959)
 Library Bears (1966, Fox Chase Branch, Free Library of Philadelphia)
 Bear Cub with Frog (1966, West Oak Lane Branch, Free Library of Philadelphia)
 Otter (1975, Children's Literature Research Collection, Free Library of Philadelphia)

Papashvily exhibited widely in solo exhibitions and with painters who were his friends.

See also
 List of Georgians
 List of Georgian writers
 List of sculptors
 Culture of Georgia

References

External links
 Finding Aid for the George and Helen Papashvily Archives, Special Collections, Linderman Library, Lehigh University
 Dictionary of Georgian National Biography

Literature about George Papashvily
 American Artist magazine, October, 1955.
 George Papashvily: Sculptor, a retrospective catalogue with an introduction by Charles H. Muhlenberg, Pennsylvania, 1979.

1898 births
1978 deaths
American people of Georgian (country) descent
Sculptors from Georgia (country)
Male writers from Georgia (country)
20th-century sculptors
20th-century artists from Georgia (country)
Soviet emigrants to the United States
People from Mtskheta-Mtianeti
Russian military personnel of World War I
American male novelists
American male sculptors
20th-century American novelists
20th-century American sculptors
20th-century American male artists
20th-century American male writers